Fox Chase Inn is a historic inn and tavern located in West Whiteland Township, Chester County, Pennsylvania. The original section was built about 1765, and is a two-story, two bay, rectangular stone structure in the "Penn Plan."  It was later expanded to a two-story, four bay, double entrance Georgian style building.  It has a full-width front porch. The building housed an inn and tavern until 1800.

It was listed on the National Register of Historic Places in 1984.

References

Hotel buildings on the National Register of Historic Places in Pennsylvania
Georgian architecture in Pennsylvania
Hotel buildings completed in 1765
Buildings and structures in Chester County, Pennsylvania
National Register of Historic Places in Chester County, Pennsylvania